Douglas S. Freeman High School is an American educational institution located in the western part of Virginia's Henrico County.

History
Part of Henrico County Public Schools system, the institution is named for Pulitzer Prize-winning Virginia author, newspaper editor, historian and pioneering radio broadcaster Douglas Southall Freeman (1886–1953). It opened in 1954, slightly more than one year after Freeman's death.

Academics
The principal of the school is John Marshall.

Henrico County runs a system in which each high school contains a specialty center, a separate but integrated entity within the school that functions as a magnet program. The centers offer advanced courses to students who have clear interests and specific educational and/or career goals. Douglas Freeman High School's center is the Center for Leadership, Government and Global Economics, led by Robert Peck.

Athletics
Freeman is a member of the Virginia High School League. It competes in the 5A Central Region and 5A Colonial District. The school colors are blue and gray and the teams are nicknamed the "Mavericks". The colors and mascot were devised as a tribute to Douglas Freeman's extensive study of the Civil War.

Virginia High School League AAA State Championship teams
Boys' cross country: 1969, 2014
Girls' cross country: 1999
Football: 1967 (shared title with Annandale and Princess Anne)
Golf: 1963
Softball: 1980
Boys' tennis: 1982, 1985, 1989, 2001
Girls' tennis: 1983
Boys' outdoor track: 1970
Girls' volleyball: 2005
Boys’ baseball: 2022 

The boys' volleyball team were VHSL AAA State semi-finalists in 2011 and 2012. The girls' soccer team was in the state tournament in 2013. The baseball team won the last Central Region championship in 2013, and as a result advanced to the state tournament.

Media
The school publishes a newspaper (The Commentator), a literary magazine (The Educator), and a yearbook (The Historian).

Douglas Freeman High School was mentioned in a Washington Post article referring to the school's revival of the historic "Rebel Man" mascot.

Notable alumni 

John Aboud — founder of Modern Humorist, and commentator on VH1's Best Week Ever
Kevin Aviance — dance music artist and performer
Steve Bassett — co-author of Virginia's state popular song (with Robbin Thompson)
Dean Fleischer Camp - filmmaker and co-creator of Marcel the Shell with Shoes On
Peter Hamby — head of News at Snapchat; Vanity Fair columnist; former CNN political correspondent
Rich Landrum- Well known radio and TV announcer for WXEX (now WRIC) TV, as well  the weekly syndicated (World Wide Wrestling TV show) www.midatlanticgateway.com
Sheri Holman — bestselling novelist, screenwriter, and founding member of The Moth
Bill Leverty — guitarist for the American rock band Firehouse
Bernard Siegel — founder and Executive Director of the Genetics Policy Institute
Tommy Siegel — guitarist and vocalist in pop band Jukebox the Ghost
Barty Smith — player for NFL's Green Bay Packers (1974–1981); member of the Virginia Sports Hall of Fame Class of 1999
Ellen Spiro — award-winning documentary filmmaker; class of 1982
Constance Wu — actress, Fresh Off the Boat and  Crazy Rich Asians.
Elliott Yamin — third-place finisher on the fifth season of the TV show American Idol; was a student at Freeman High but never graduated

In popular culture
James E. Ryan's book Five Miles Away, A World Apart: One City, Two Schools, and the Story of Educational Opportunity in Modern America explores the issue of economic school segregation by comparing Freeman to nearby Thomas Jefferson High School, located in the city of Richmond. Arguing for more freedom in school choice, Ryan cites findings that "high-poverty" schools (like Thomas Jefferson) consistently under-perform "low-poverty" schools (like Freeman) academically, regardless of the financial resources allocated to them. He concludes: "The truth is that separating the poor and politically powerless in their own schools and districts is antithetical to the idea of equal educational opportunity."

References

External links
Douglas S. Freeman High School
DSF Alumni Association

Freeman, Douglas S. High School
Freeman, Douglas S.
Educational institutions established in 1954
1954 establishments in Virginia